In enzymology, a 6-carboxyhexanoate—CoA ligase is an enzyme that catalyzes the chemical reaction

ATP + 6-carboxyhexanoate + CoA  AMP + diphosphate + 6-carboxyhexanoyl-CoA

The 3 substrates of this enzyme are ATP, 6-carboxyhexanoate, and CoA, whereas its 3 products are AMP, diphosphate, and 6-carboxyhexanoyl-CoA.

This enzyme belongs to the family of ligases, specifically those forming carbon-sulfur bonds as acid-thiol ligases.  The systematic name of this enzyme class is 6-carboxyhexanoate:CoA ligase (AMP-forming). Other names in common use include 6-carboxyhexanoyl-CoA synthetase, and pimelyl-CoA synthetase.  This enzyme participates in biotin metabolism.

References

 
 

EC 6.2.1
Enzymes of unknown structure